Seia, São Romão e Lapa dos Dinheiros is a civil parish in the municipality of Seia, Portugal. It was formed in 2013 by the merger of the former parishes Seia, São Romão and Lapa dos Dinheiros. The population in 2021 was 8,705, in an area of 53.80 km2.

References

Freguesias of Seia